Larry or Lawrence Butler may refer to:

Lawrence W. Butler (1908–1988), American special effects artist
Larry Butler (producer) (1942–2012), American country music producer and songwriter
Larry Butler (Canadian football) (born 1952), American player of Canadian football
Larry Butler (darts player) (born 1957), American darts player
Lawrence Butler (basketball) (born 1957), American basketball player
Larry Butler (Irish politician), Irish Fianna Fáil politician
Larry Butler (Connecticut politician), member of the Connecticut House of Representatives
Lawrence Butler (born 1953), American diplomat

See also
Lawrence Butler (disambiguation)